"War for Earth-3" is a 2022 crossover event in DC Comics publications. Written by Robbie Thompson, Denis Hopeless and Jeremy Adams, the story follows a conflict between the Suicide Squad, Crime Syndicate of America, and Teen Titans as Amanda Waller creates a plan to have an everlasting Suicide Squad. The story appeared in five issues spread across three comic titles published over five weeks in March 2022. The event received mixed reviews from critics, with critics praising the story and action but criticizing the art and characters, particularly the Crime Syndicate.

Publication history 
In December 2021, it was announced by Screen Rant that DC Comics will create a crossover event featuring Teen Titans, Suicide Squad, Crime Syndicate and Flash that will deal with Amanda Waller trying to exert her influence over the DC Multiverse.

Plot summary

Prelude 
Bloodsport is hired by Amanda Waller to recruit more alternate universes of Suicide Squad in Earth-3 when he sees Ultraman, Owlman, Superwoman, Emerald Knight (an evil version of John Stewart) terrorizing civilians. Bloodsport attacks Black Siren (an evil version of Black Canary) when Ultraman arrives and nearly kills him. Back on Earth-Prime, Amanda Waller's Suicide Squad (Talon, Nocturna, Match, Culebra, Ambush Bug, and Major Force) are training with Amanda Waller still not trusting Peacemaker for letting Rick Flag escape. Amanda Waller sends the Suicide Squad to Earth-3 where they fight the Crime Syndicate of America and they rescue Bloodsport and kidnap Black Siren before going back to Russia where they meet Conner Kent.

It is revealed that Rick Flag and Amanda Waller had a fallout because Amanda Waller sees Suicide Squad as disposable and wants to create a new Justice League to take over the world, which causes Amanda Waller to imprison Rick Flag, but Peacemaker frees him. Match and Conner fight while Bloodsport and Nocturna investigate and its revealed that Amanda Waller cloned Connor Kent which created Match. Amanda Waller teleports the Suicide Squad members away, and Rick Flag decides to recruit his own team starting with Mirror Master, and it's revealed that Talon is a mole in the Suicide Squad.

While the Suicide Squad deals with Sojourner "Jo" Mullein (a Green Lantern) and Hellsquad with Rick Flag recruiting Cheetah, Peacemaker, Lor-Zod and a Parademon to take down Amanda Waller. Amanda Waller has been gathering a group of superpowered villains to take over Earth-3, and Peacemaker asks Bloodsport on why is he still working with Amanda Waller when he has no bomb ever since his fight with Ultraman. Amanda Waller sends the Suicide Squad to Earth-8 where they fight the Retaliators (Purple Rain, Behemoth, American Crusader, Hunda Jin, Red Dragon, LadyBug and Machinehead). Bloodsport and Peacemaker fight, with Bloodsport revealing he's still working for Amanda Waller because she has his brothers from different universes, and she has planted bombs in his brothers in case Bloodsport rebels against her. Bloodsport defeats Peacemaker, but spares him after Peacemaker tells him something, which causes Bloodsport joins Rick Flag's group. The Suicide Squad defeats the Retaliators, but are confronted by The Lightning Strikes (Thrill Kill, Thing Man, Dead Red, Oedipus, and Blood Pouch).

Agent Parker asks Amanda Waller to retreat, but Amanda Waller stands her ground and wants to kill Dr. Rodriguez after realizing Dr. Rodriguez is working with Rick Flag. Major Force betrays the Suicide Squad and starts fighting them, but Black Siren kills him. Amanda Waller tries to detonate the bomb in Black Siren's skull, however Dr. Rodriguez disabled it. Amanda Waller is disappointed with how the Suicide Squad acted on Earth-8, and teleports Match to her due to her disgust with Match gaining emotions and feelings for Nocturna. Rick Flag confronts Amanda Waller, but Amanda reveals she employed Clayface, and plans to go to Earth-3 with her soldiers, Match, Black Hand and Black Siren.

Main plot 
Emerald Knight hosts a party for Ultraman, but Ultraman grows impatient and kills everyone in the party. While in space, Ultraman sees Amanda Waller arriving on his Earth, and sees Superwoman being a Dominatrix to Owlman and gets angry so he confronts her and Owlman. Emerald Knight confronts Amanda Waller's team, but is defeated by Black Hand. Owlman goes out to fight Amanda Waller's team to save Emerald Knight, but his plane is taken down by Black Siren. Amanda Waller calls Ultraman from Emerald Knight's ring, and Superwoman and Ultraman go to confront her. Dr. Rodriguez injects her with a serum to save Rick Flag's team, and they all travel to confront Amanda Waller, but are shocked when Amanda Waller has convinced Ultraman and Emerald Knight to join her side. 

Rick Flag's team is forced to retreat, and Dr. Rodriguez is captured by Amanda Waller while Match and Nocturna are sent to Hell by Etrigan the Demon. Talon and Culbera travels back to Earth-3's Gotham City where its revealed he did not kill Talon in order to find a weakness for the Crime Syndicate of America's members. Culbera is killed by Johnny Quick and takes over Owlman's body. Ambush Bug transports Peacemaker to Owlman's Fortress of Solitude to find a weapon to stop Owlman when they are confronted by Superwoman who wants to kill Ultraman and Amanda Waller for what they did to Owlman. Johnny Quick rushes in and gets the secret weapon while Black Siren uses her powers to bring down the Fortress of Solitude on Superwoman, Peacemaker and Ambush Bug. 

Johnny Quick arrives on Earth-Prime to get the Cosmic Treadmill. After Wally West returns back from his recent adventure with his kids, Wally learns that Linda Park has developed superspeed. Wally hears that Johnny Quick is trying to find the Cosmic Treadmill from orders of Amanda Waller, but Mirror Master appears and tries to destroy the Cosmic Treadmill. It is revealed that Johnny Quick was trapped in the Speed Force but Amanda Waller and Etrigan freed him, with Johnny Quick getting the Cosmic Treadmill and disappearing.  Raven tries to heal Cyborg and Beast Boy after Red X injured them in a previous battle, but they are interrupted by Rick Flag and Harley Quinn from Earth-8. Nightwing, Starfire, Donna Troy, Roy Harper, and Wally West decide to go help out the Suicide Squad, but unbeknownst to them Emiko Queen and a couple of their students sneak in their ship. 

Rick Flag's Suicide Squad and the Teen Titans fight the Crime Syndicate on Earth-3 while Amanda Waller captures Emiko Queen and the Titans students. Earth-8 Harley Quinn and Mirror Master capture Yorick (a creature with a bird skull for a head) to find out what Amanda Waller is planning. Superwoman saves Peacemaker and Ambush Bug, who goes off to fight Ultraman, who is convinced by Rick Flag that Amanda Waller is using him as a puppet because her true plans is to remove Earth-3 from the DC Multiverse. Amanda Waller tells the Teen Titans to stand down and promises to teleport the Teen Titans and their students away from Earth-3 as she deems them innocent people who are not involved in this. Ultraman nearly kills Superwoman, but Ambush Bug and Mirror Master use their teleport abilities to teleport Ultraman to multiple locations where he is weakened, while Rick Flag, Bloodsport, and Peacemaker shoot Ultraman which gives Emerald Knight enough time to fix the Phantom Zone projecter to send Ultraman into the Phantom Zone. Amanda Waller teleports the rest of the Suicide Squad back to Earth-Prime, creates her own Justice League (Match, Earth-3 Black Canary, Nocturna, Etrigan, Johnny Quick and Superwoman) and Earth-3 is split off from the DC Multiverse.

Critical reception 
According to Comic Book Roundup, War for Earth-3 #1 received an average rating of 6.8 out of 10 based on 10 reviews. 

According to Comic Book Roundup, Suicide Squad #13 received an average rating of 7.6 out of 10 based on 6 reviews. 

According to Comic Book Roundup, Flash #780 received an average rating of 8.6 out of 10 based on 7 reviews. 

According to Comic Book Roundup, Teen Titans Academy #13 received an average rating of 7.6 out of 10 based on 6 reviews. 

According to Comic Book Roundup, War for Earth-3 #2 received an average rating of 5.7 out of 10 based on 5 reviews.

Collected edition

References